The Platino Award for Best First Feature Film (Spanish: Premio Platino a la mejor ópera prima de ficción iberoamericana) is one of the Platino Awards, Ibero-America's film awards, presented by the Entidad de Gestión de Derechos de los Productores Audiovisuales (EGEDA) and the Federación Iberoamericana de Productores Cinematográficos y Audiovisuales (FIPCA). 

The category was first awarded at the 2nd Platino Awards in 2015, with Venezuelan film La distancia más larga being the first recipient of the award.

In the list below the winner of the award for each year is shown first, followed by the other nominees.

Awards and nominations

2010s

2020s

References

Platino Awards
Directorial debut film awards